Evaristo de Oliveira Costa Merigo, commonly known as Evaristo Costa (born September 30, 1976, in São José dos Campos) is a Brazilian journalist.

He graduated in Social Communication at Universidade Braz Cubas in Mogi das Cruzes. Costa started working as a journalist in 1995, when he was still in college and worked in a TV producing studio during two years, then moving to TV Vanguarda, initially as a producer and then working as reporter and presenter. In September 1999, he was transferred to TV Globo, where he was a reporter for the TV show Mais Você, hosted by Ana Maria Braga.

In 2001, Costa moved to SPTV, a São Paulo local news program. Then he presented the weather forecast of Globo Rural, SPTV, Bom Dia Brasil and Jornal Nacional until 2 February 2004, when Costa became co-host of the midday news program Jornal Hoje with Sandra Annenberg

In February 2015 Costa briefly joined the Fantástico team, replacing Tadeu Schmidt during the holidays.

At the end of 2017, he had resigned his 14-year contract from Rede Globo to move to United Kingdom, where he currently lives in Cambridge.

He is currently hired by CNN Brazil.

Programs

At Rede Globo 
 Jornal Hoje (2004-2017);
 Jornal Nacional (alternate Saturdays 2013–2017);

At CNN Brazil 
 CNN Séries Originais (2020–present)

Filmography 
 Incredibles 2 (Brazilian voice, 2018)

References 

1956 births
Living people
People from São José dos Campos
Brazilian television news anchors
Brazilian expatriates in the United Kingdom